Professor Bundhit Eua-arporn (born 22 July 1965) has been President of Chulalongkorn University since 18 May 2016 and presently a member of Executive Board of Banpu Power Public Company Limited.

Other positions held
 Board Member, National Reform Committee in Energy, National Reform Committee (2017)
 Honorary Board Member, Thailand Institute of Scientific and Technological Research (2015 - 2016)
 Dean, Faculty of Engineering, Chulalongkorn University (2013 - 2016)
 Director, Energy Research Institute, Chulalongkorn University (2007 - 2013)

References

1965 births
Living people
Bundhit Eua-arporn
Bundhit Eua-arporn
Alumni of Imperial College London
Bundhit Eua-arporn